The Bakerloo line is a London Underground line that goes from  in suburban north-west London to  in south London, via the West End. It runs partly on the surface and partly in deep-level tube tunnels.

The line's name is a portmanteau of its original name, the Baker Street & Waterloo Railway. From  to Harrow & Wealdstone (the section above ground), the line shares tracks with the London Overground Watford DC line and runs parallel to the West Coast Main Line.

Opened between 1906 and 1915, many of its stations retain elements of their design to a common standard: the stations below ground using Art Nouveau decorative tiling by Leslie Green, and the above-ground stations built in red brick with stone detailing in an Arts & Crafts style. It is the ninth-busiest line on the network, carrying more than 111 million passengers annually.

The line uses 1972 Stock trains, which are the oldest trains in passenger service in Britain at 51 years old.

History

The route had its origins in the failed projects of the pneumatic 1865 Waterloo and Whitehall Railway and the 1882 Charing Cross and Waterloo Electric Railway.

Originally called the Baker Street & Waterloo Railway, the line was constructed by the Underground Electric Railways Company of London (UERL) and opened between Lambeth North (at the time named Kennington Road) and Baker Street on 10 March 1906. It was extended eastward to Elephant & Castle five months later, on 5 August. The contraction of the name to "Bakerloo" rapidly caught on, and the official name was changed to match in July 1906.

When work on the line started in June 1898, it had been financed by the mining entrepreneur and company promoter Whitaker Wright, who fell foul of the law over the financial proceedings involved and dramatically committed suicide at the Royal Courts of Justice, after being convicted in 1904. As a result, work on the line was stopped for a few months and did not resume until Charles Yerkes and UERL stepped in and took over the project.

By 1913, the line had been extended westward from its original northern terminus at Baker Street, with interchange stations with the Great Central Railway at Marylebone and with the Great Western Railway at Paddington, and a new station at Edgware Road.

Watford branch

In 1915, the line was extended to Queen's Park, where it joined the LNWR's Euston-Watford DC line (now part of London Overground) to Watford Junction. Bakerloo services to Watford Junction were reduced in the 1960s and cut back in 1982 to Stonebridge Park.

Services as far as Harrow & Wealdstone were gradually restored from 1984, and in 1989 the present all-day service was instituted.

Stanmore branch
By the mid-1930s, the Metropolitan line was suffering from congestion caused by the limited capacity of its tracks between Baker Street and Finchley Road stations. To relieve this pressure, the network-wide New Works Programme included the construction of new sections of tunnel between the Bakerloo line's platforms at Baker Street and Finchley Road and the replacement of three Metropolitan line stations (Lord's, Marlborough Road and Swiss Cottage) between those points with two new Bakerloo stations (St John's Wood and Swiss Cottage). The Bakerloo line took over the Metropolitan line's service to Stanmore on 20 November 1939. The branch remained part of the Bakerloo line until 1 May 1979, when similar congestion problems for the Bakerloo line caused by two branches converging at Baker Street led to the creation of the Jubilee line, initially formed by connecting the Stanmore branch to new tunnels bored between Baker Street and Charing Cross.

When the Bakerloo line was extended to Watford in 1915, it acquired an interchange at Harrow & Wealdstone with another route to Stanmore, the Stanmore branch line. This branch line was operated by the LNWR and terminated at a separate Stanmore station (later renamed ). It was closed in 1964, partly due to the success of the rival Metropolitan/Bakerloo Underground line to Stanmore.

Camberwell extension

An extension at the southern end of the line to Camberwell and Denmark Hill was proposed and approved in 1931 as part of the London Electric Metropolitan District and Central London Railway Companies (Works) Act, 1931. In April 1937, the estimated cost of the proposed extension was £5,000,000 (approximately £ today) and the London Passenger Transport Board announced that, due to rising materials prices, the extension had been postponed until the Board's finances improved. Apart from the extension of the sidings south of Elephant & Castle, no work on the extension took place before the Second World War, but the powers were renewed by the government in 1947 under the Special Enactments (Extension of Time) Act, 1940. A projected extension as far as Camberwell was shown on a 1949 edition of the Underground map but no further work was done. The train describers at Warwick Avenue station showed Camberwell as a destination until the 1990s. Further extensions of the line were considered, south to Peckham Rye in the 1970s, and east to London Docklands and Canary Wharf in the 1980s. Neither proposal was proceeded with.

Electricity supply
One oddity is that, almost from its opening until 1917, the Bakerloo operated with the polarity of the conductor rails reversed, the outside rail negative and the centre rail positive. This came about because the Bakerloo shared a power source with the District Railway. On the Bakerloo, the outside conductor rail tended to leak to the tunnel wall, whereas on the District Railway, the centre rail shared a similar problem. The solution was to reverse the polarity on the Bakerloo line, so that the negative rail leaked on both systems. In 1917, the two lines were separated when the LNWR began its 'New Line' service between Euston and Watford Junction, which the Bakerloo would share north of Queens Park. As a result, normal operation was restored.

Centenary
The line celebrated its centenary on 10 March 2006, when events were organised with actors and staff in Edwardian costume entertaining travellers.

2017 fire
In 2017, a fire on a train at Oxford Circus station caused disruption on the Bakerloo line. A number of people were treated for the effects of smoke inhalation.

Future developments

Re-extension to Watford Junction
Over the next few years the northern section of the line may again see changes following the decision in February 2006 to transfer responsibility for Euston-Watford suburban services (on the Watford DC Line) from the Department for Transport (DfT) to Transport for London (TfL). This was in conjunction with the reorganisation of a number of north London railways under London Overground.

Under a former London Plan, it was projected that by 2026 the Bakerloo line would be re-extended from Harrow & Wealdstone to Watford Junction, restoring the pre-1982 service. The railway line from Queens Park to Watford Junction, currently shared with London Overground, would be shared with the Bakerloo line. The Best And Final Bid documentation for the Croxley Rail Link project indicates that this Bakerloo line extension is now "unlikely" because "TfL's plans to extend the Bakerloo line to Watford Junction are on hold indefinitely due to funding and business case constraints".

Extension to Lewisham and Hayes 

Since the late 2000s, Transport for London (TfL) has been planning an extension of the line, with a route to Lewisham via Old Kent Road safeguarded in 2021. Four stations would be built, at Burgess Park, Old Kent Road, New Cross Gate and Lewisham, with provision for a further extension along the Mid-Kent line to Hayes and Beckenham Junction. This could occur following the completion of the extension to Lewisham. Estimated to cost between £4.7bn to £7.9bn (in 2017 prices), the extension would take around 7 years to construct. Due to TfL's poor finances following the COVID-19 pandemic, work to implement the extension is currently on hold.

Rolling stock

Current rolling stock 

The Bakerloo line is operated entirely by 1972 Stock, displaced from the Jubilee line by 1983 stock. The trains are maintained at Stonebridge Park depot. All Bakerloo line trains are painted in the London Underground livery of red, grey and blue, and are the smaller size of the two sizes used on the network, since the line goes deep underground in small tunnels.

In the early 2000s, the interiors of the trains were 'deep-cleaned' and the upholstery replaced using a blue moquette. The seating layouts are both longitudinal and transverse; some cars have longitudinal seating only. A TfL Finance and Policy Committee Paper dated 11 March 2015 revealed that the repair programme for the 1972 Stock would be more expensive than anticipated, due to the unexpectedly inferior condition of the fleet.

In early 2016, a four-year refurbishment programme began with the first of the new-look cars operating on the line in March. Each car's interior is being cleaned, the seating moquette replaced with a variation of the Barman type seen on other lines, and handrails and lighting renewed. Each car is being assessed and repair work carried out to ensure the stock can operate safely.

Based on a November 2021 paper, due to a lack of funding, replacement may not occur until the late 2030s or early 2040s, being possibly 60-70 years old at the time of replacement, likely double their design life. Since the withdrawal of the Class 483 on the Isle of Wight, the 1972 Stock have become the oldest non-heritage trains running in the United Kingdom.

Future rolling stock 

In the late 1990s, the Labour government initiated a public–private partnership (PPP) to reverse years of underinvestment in London Underground. Under the PPP contract, Metronet – the private consortium responsible for the Bakerloo line – would order new rolling stock for the line. This would take place following the delivery of 2009 Stock and S Stock trains, with an order for 24 new Bakerloo line trains. These would have entered service by 2019. However, Metronet collapsed in 2007 after cost overruns, and the PPP ended in 2010.

In the mid 2010s, TfL began a process of ordering new rolling stock to replace trains on the Piccadilly, Central, Bakerloo and Waterloo & City lines. A feasibility study into the new trains showed that new generation trains and re-signalling could increase capacity on the Bakerloo line by 25%, with 27 trains per hour. 

In June 2018, the Siemens Mobility Inspiro design was selected. These trains would have an open gangway design, wider doorways, air conditioning and the ability to run automatically with a new signalling system. TfL could only afford to order Piccadilly line trains at a cost of £1.5bn. However, the contract with Siemens includes an option for 40 trains for the Bakerloo line in the future. This would take place after the delivery of the Piccadilly line trains in the late 2020s.

Former rolling stock 

When opened in 1906, the Bakerloo line was operated by Gate Stock trains, built at Trafford Park, Manchester. To cope with the extension to Queen's Park, 12 extra motor cars of the London Underground 1914 Stock were ordered, ten from Brush of Loughborough and two from the Leeds Forge Company.

To operate services north of Queen's Park, 72 additional cars were built by the Metropolitan Carriage, Waggon and Finance Company of Birmingham. These trains, known as the Watford Joint Stock, were partly owned by the Underground and partly by the London and North Western Railway (later London, Midland and Scottish Railway (LMS)). They were initially painted in LNWR livery. They were not equipped with air-operated doors and proved slow and unreliable, so they were replaced by new trains of Standard Stock in 1930 (although a few were retained by the LMS). For some years in the 1930s, Watford trains had a distinctive blue stripe at window level.

In 1932, some carriages built for the Piccadilly line by Cammell Laird in Nottingham in 1919 were transferred to the Bakerloo line. When built, these had been the first Tube trains to have air-operated doors. These were later replaced by more trains of Standard Stock, in turn being replaced by 1938 stock and 1949 stock.

Until the opening of the Jubilee line in 1979, the Bakerloo line was worked by both 1938 stock and 1972 stock. The 1972 stock was intended for the Jubilee line, so from 1979 the Bakerloo line (now minus the Stanmore branch) was again entirely operated by 1938 stock. From 1983, the 1938 stock began to be replaced by trains of 1959 stock, but this was a temporary measure until 1972 stock became available. The last 1938 stock train was withdrawn on 20 November 1985. From 1986, the 1959 stock was transferred to the Northern line.

Map

Services 
As of May 2021, weekday off-peak and Sunday services on Bakerloo line are:
 4 tph (trains per hour) from Harrow & Wealdstone to Elephant & Castle
 4 tph from Stonebridge Park to Elephant & Castle
 8 tph from Queen's Park to Elephant & Castle

This forms a 16 tph service (or a train approximately every 4 minutes) between Queen's Park and Elephant & Castle. A 20 tph service runs on this section of the line during the weekday peak and all day on Saturdays.

Stations 

Note: For the former Stanmore branch of the Bakerloo line, see the Jubilee line article.

Former stations

Watford branch

Between 1917 and 1982, Bakerloo line trains continued along the DC line past Harrow & Wealdstone to Watford Junction. These stations continue to be served by London Overground. Proposals have surfaced to re-extend the Bakerloo line to Watford Junction and service the following stations:

Stanmore branch 

The Stanmore branch was originally constructed by the Metropolitan Railway and was designated as the Stanmore branch of the Bakerloo line in 1939. It was transferred to the Jubilee line on 1 May 1979. It connected to the main Bakerloo line at Baker Street.

 Stanmore
 Canons Park
 Queensbury
 Kingsbury
 Wembley Park
 Neasden
 Dollis Hill
 Willesden Green
 Kilburn
 West Hampstead
 Finchley Road
 Swiss Cottage
 St John's Wood
 Baker Street

Depots

The Bakerloo line is currently served by three depots: a main depot at Stonebridge Park, opened on 9 April 1978 on the site of a former British Rail power station which contains the fleet's maintenance facilities; the original depot at London Road (between Elephant and Castle and Lambeth North, though connected to the line between Lambeth North and Waterloo); and a small depot immediately north of Queens Park, built in 1915. The Queens Park depot is unique on the London Underground network in that trains in passenger service run through it.

When Bakerloo line services ran to Watford, there was also an additional depot, Croxley Green Light Maintenance Depot at Croxley Green; this depot closed in November 1985 following the withdrawal of services.

When the Bakerloo had two branches at its northern end, to Queens Park (as currently) and to Stanmore (now taken over by the Jubilee line), the depot at Neasden on the Stanmore branch was the principal one on the line. The Jubilee taking over this branch from 1979 was the reason behind building the new Stonebridge Park depot.

The London Road depot is unusual in that, although the depot is on the surface, the line passes nearby in tunnel, connected by a short and sharply graded branch tunnel.

See also

 Leslie Green, architect of the Baker Street & Waterloo Railway's early stations
 Stanley Heaps, architect of the extension stations from Warwick Avenue to Kilburn Park
 List of crossings of the River Thames
 Tunnels underneath the River Thames

Maps

Harrow & Wealdstone – 
Kenton – 
South Kenton – 
North Wembley – 
Wembley Central – 
Stonebridge Park – 
Harlesden – 
Willesden Junction – 
Kensal Green – 
Queen's Park – 
Kilburn Park – 
Maida Vale – 
Warwick Avenue – 
Paddington (Bakerloo line) – 
Edgware Road (Bakerloo line) – 
Marylebone – 
Baker Street – 
Regent's Park – 
Oxford Circus – 
Piccadilly Circus – 
Charing Cross – 
Embankment – 
Waterloo – 
Lambeth North – 
Elephant & Castle – 
Stonebridge Park Depot – 
London Road Depot – 
Queens Park Depot –

References

External links

 
 
 
 

London Underground lines
Railway lines opened in 1906
Transport in the London Borough of Southwark
Transport in the London Borough of Lambeth
Transport in the City of Westminster
Transport in the London Borough of Brent
Transport in the London Borough of Harrow
Tunnels underneath the River Thames
Standard gauge railways in London
1906 establishments in England